Topolovci (Prekmurje Slovene: Topolouvci) is a small village in the Municipality of Cankova in the Prekmurje region of northeastern Slovenia.

References

External links
Topolovci on Geopedia

Populated places in the Municipality of Cankova